Recurvaria synestia is a moth of the family Gelechiidae. It is found in Argentina.

References

Moths described in 1939
Recurvaria
Moths of South America